T46, T-46, T.46, T 46 or variant may refer to:

 Fairchild T-46, USAF jet trainer
 T46, a para-athletics classification for track athletes with arm amputations
 T-46 (Tank) a Soviet tank
 Slingsby T.46 sailplane glider
 SJ T46 Class train engine